Wharton is a civil parish near Kirkby Stephen in the Eden District of Cumbria, England, which, historically, was part of Westmorland.  It has a population of 31. As the population taken at the 2011 Census remained less than 100 details are included in the parish of Mallerstang. 

Wharton was historically a township in the ancient parish of Kirkby Stephen.  It became a separate civil parish in 1866.  It became part of Cumbria in 1974, and since 2016 has fallen within the Yorkshire Dales National Park.

The parish has a Grade 1 listed house called Wharton Hall and a castle called Lammerside Castle.  Kirkby Stephen railway station is within the northern boundary of the parish.

See also

Listed buildings in Wharton, Cumbria

References

External links 
 Cumbria County History Trust: Wharton (nb: provisional research only – see Talk page)
 http://www.geog.port.ac.uk/webmap/thelakes/html/lgaz/lk12422.htm
 http://www.britishlistedbuildings.co.uk/england/cumbria/wharton

Civil parishes in Cumbria
Eden District